The British Nieuport Memorial is a First World War memorial, located in the Belgian port city of Nieuwpoort, which is at the mouth of the River Yser. The memorial lists 547 names of British officers and men with no known grave who were killed in the Siege of Antwerp in 1914 or in the defence of this part of the Western Front from June to November 1917. Those that fought in 1914 were members of the Royal Naval Division. The fighting in 1917, when XV Corps defended the line from Sint-Joris to the sea, included the German use of chemical weapons such as mustard gas and Blue Cross.

Designed by the Scottish architect William Bryce Binnie, the memorial is an 8-metre-high pylon of Euville stone, a limestone from Euville. The names of those commemorated are cast on bronze panels surrounding the base of the pylon. Three lions, carved by the British sculptor Charles Sargeant Jagger, stand guard at the corners of the memorial's triangular paved platform. Around the top of the bronze name panels is cast the words from Laurence Binyon's famous poem, "For the Fallen": 

The memorial was unveiled on 1 July 1928 by Sir George Macdonogh, a commissioner for the Imperial War Graves Commission (now Commonwealth War Graves Commission). Macdonogh had been a staff officer and general for the Directorate of Military Intelligence for most of the war, being appointed Adjutant-General to the Forces in September 1918.

The King Albert I Memorial, dedicated to both the King and his Belgian troops during the First World War, is located directly next to the Nieuport Memorial.

Footnotes and references

See also
 List of World War I memorials and cemeteries in Flanders

External links

Commonwealth War Graves Commission details of the Nieuport Memorial
Memorials to the Missing - Belgium (includes photograph)
Nieuport Memorial (Belgian heritage register)
Catalogue entry for Nieuport Memorial register (National Library of Australia)

Commonwealth War Graves Commission memorials
World War I memorials in Belgium
Buildings and structures completed in 1928
Nieuwpoort, Belgium